Gottskálk grimmi Nikulasson (1469 – 8 December 1520), was the Bishop of Hólar from May 1497 to 1520. 
He was the nephew of Ólafur Rögnvaldsson  who preceded him as  bishop. He was succeeded by  Jón Arason (1484–1550), the last Roman Catholic bishop in Iceland prior to the restoration in 1923.

Gottskálk Nikulasson has received  harsh judgment in Icelandic history resulting in his nickname grimmi meaning cruel. He is also known as the author of a  book about black magic; Rauðskinna.

References

Other sources
Páll Eggert Ólason (1948) Íslenskar æviskrár (Hið íslenska bókmenntafélag) 

1469 births
1520 deaths
15th-century Roman Catholic bishops in Iceland
Icelandic writers
16th-century Roman Catholic bishops in Iceland